Adalberto Álvarez (22 November 1948 – 1 September 2021) was a Cuban pianist, musical director, and composer.

Biography
Adalberto Álvarez was born in Camaguey on November 22, 1948. During the late 1960s and early 1970s, Álvarez attended the National School of Arts in Havana and also served as professor of Musical Literature at the Provincial School of Art of Camagüey during 1970s . He started the Cuban band Son 14 in the 1970s and disbanded it in the 1980s. In 1984, Álvarez started the group Adalberto Alvarez y su Son, which he directed until his death after contracting COVID-19. The genre of his music is son, a style of music that originated in Cuba.  He was also deputy to the National Assembly of People's Power between 2013 and 2018 and was elected from Camagüey municipality.

Awards and honours 
In 2008, he was awarded National Music Award. He also received several distinctions which include Distinction for National Culture, Félix Varela Order and the Cubadisco Award several times.

Adalberto Álvarez y su Son
Adalberto Álvarez y su Son is the band founded in 1984 by Álvarez.

References

External links
 Official site
 
 

1948 births
2021 deaths
Cuban male songwriters
Cuban pianists
People from Camagüey
Cuban bandleaders
Son cubano singers
Male pianists
21st-century pianists
21st-century male musicians
Deaths from the COVID-19 pandemic in Cuba
21st-century Cuban musicians
20th-century male musicians
20th-century pianists
20th-century Cuban musicians
National Art Schools (Cuba) alumni